Milorad Sokolović (10 August 1922 – 26 June 1999), also known by his nickname Soko (in English Falcon), was a Serbian basketball player, coach and sports journalist. He represented the Yugoslavia national basketball team internationally.

Basketball career

Playing career 
Sokolović played for Belgrade-based teams Metalac and Crvena zvezda of the Yugoslav First League. He won six National Championships with the Zvezda. In July 1950, he was a member of the Zvezda squad that won an international cup tournament in Milan, Italy.

Sokolović was a member of the Yugoslavia national basketball team at the 1950 FIBA World Championship in Buenos Aires, Argentina. Over four tournament games, he averaged 0.5 points per game. The World Championship in Argentina was the inaugural tournament.

Coaching career 
Sokolović coached the women's team of Crvena zvezda in the Yugoslav Women's Basketball League during 1950s. He succeeded Nebojša Popović on that coaching position.

Sokolović coached the Yugoslavia women's national team at the 1958 European Women's Basketball Championships in Poland.

Administrator
Sokolović served as the secretary-general of the Yugoslav Basketball Federation and as a President of basketball club Crvena zvezda.

Journalism
Sokolović also worked as a sports journalist, contributing to Sport, a Serbian daily sports newspaper.

Career achievements
As player
 Yugoslav League champion: 6 (with Crvena zvezda: 1947, 1948, 1949, 1950, 1951, 1952)
As coach
 Yugoslav Women's League champion: 5 (with Crvena zvezda: 1953, 1954, 1955, 1956, 1957)

In popular culture
 In the 2015 Serbian sports drama We Will Be the World Champions Sokolović is portrayed by Nemanja Stamatović.

References

1922 births
1999 deaths
1950 FIBA World Championship players
Centers (basketball)
KK Crvena zvezda players
ŽKK Crvena zvezda coaches
KK Crvena Zvezda executives
OKK Beograd players
Serbian journalists
Serbian basketball executives and administrators
Serbian men's basketball players
Serbian men's basketball coaches
Serbian newspaper editors
Yugoslav men's basketball players
Yugoslav basketball coaches
Yugoslav journalists
1942 Belgrade Basketball Championship players